Sakio Bika (born 18 April 1979) is a Cameroonian-born Australian professional boxer. He held the WBC super-middleweight title from 2013 to 2014, and previously the IBO super-middleweight title from 2008 to 2010. In 2015 he challenged once for the unified light-heavyweight world title, and in 2007 won the third season of The Contender reality TV series.

Amateur career
As an amateur, Bika was a member of the 2000 Cameroonian Olympic Team as a Light middleweight. He lost to Scott MacIntosh of Canada. Since the 2000 Olympics Bika fights out of Sydney, Australia.

Professional career
Sakio took the opportunity to fight the German champion Markus Beyer for the WBC Super Middleweight world title in Germany in May 2005. After an accidental head clash in round 4 the doctor ruled Beyer unable to continue. Under WBC rules the bout was declared a technical draw. Sakio was awarded all 4 rounds on one judges score card, and the stoppage was considered controversial.

Bika vs. Calzaghe
On 14 October 2006 Bika challenged Joe Calzaghe at the MEN Arena in Manchester for the IBF and WBO titles.  He was defeated unanimously on the score cards by a wide margin.

Bika's then fought undefeated Lucian Bute at the Bell Centre, Montreal, Quebec, Canada. Bute won by unanimous decision in a fight that was an IBF super middleweight title eliminator.

Sakio obtained his Australian citizenship in 2006. Although he bases himself in Sydney, Australia, Bika remains proud of his dual citizenship and his status as an African Australian.

He was one of the featured boxers on the 3rd season of the boxing reality TV series, The Contender, which premiered 4 September 2007 on ESPN. After wins against Donny McCrary and in a rematch with Sam Soliman (the only fighter to defeat Bika other than Calzaghe and Bute), Bika earned a place in the final against Jaidon Codrington at the TD Banknorth Garden in Boston on 6 November.

The Contender season 3

On Tuesday, 6 November 2007, Bika knocked out Jaidon Codrington in the championship bout to win The Contender. The fight was wild, with both fighters being knocked down in the first round. In the end, Bika stopped Codrington in the eighth round by referee stoppage (TKO).  Bika walked away with $750,000 in prize money.

After the Codrington fight, Bika returned to the ring in Australia with a first-round KO of Argentinian Gustavo Javier Kapusi. Bika won the fight right at the end of the round with a body shot.

Bika returned to the ring on 13 November 2008, in a fight with former season one contestant Peter Manfredo Jr at the Dunkin' Donuts Center. Bika won by TKO in round 3.  With the win, Bika became the International Boxing Organization super middleweight champion.

Bika fought Jean Paul Mendy on 31 July in Las Vegas, for an IBF #1 spot and a shot at the title. Bika lost the fight by disqualification in the 1st round after he hit Mendy following a knockdown and while Mendy was still on his knees.

Bika vs. Ward
After the Mendy fight Bika was given a shot at unbeaten WBA super middleweight champion Andre Ward, A voluntary defence by Ward after he defeated Allan Green. 
Bika used a fast pace a threw a total of 612 punches (400 of which were power shots) landing 201, however this was not enough to ruffle the champion who used defence and counter punching to land clean and effective blows throughout. Winning on all three scorecards Ward took a dominant decision with scores of 120–108, 118–110, 118–110, handing Bika his fifth loss.

On 2 June 2012, on the undercard of Antonio Tarver vs Lateef Kayode, Bika fought Dyah Davis, the son of Olympic gold medalist Howard Davis. Bika dominated the fight, stopping Davis in round 10 to win the NABF and WBO inter-continental super middleweight titles.

He defeated Nikola Sjekloca via unanimous decision in a WBC Eliminator.

WBC super-middleweight champion
On 22 June 2013, on the undercard of Adrien Broner vs. Paulie Malignaggi, Bika defeated Marco Antonio Peribán via 12-round majority decision to win the vacant WBC super middleweight title.

Bika had his first defense of the WBC super middleweight on 7 December 2013 undercard of Paulie Malignaggi vs. Zab Judah. He retained his title after earning a split draw against Anthony Dirrell.

On 16 August 2014, at the StubHub Center in Carson, California, Bika faced Dirrell in a championship rematch. After 12 rounds, the judges awarded the fight and the title to Dirrell by unanimous decision.

Professional boxing record

References

External links

1979 births
Cameroonian male boxers
Living people
Sportspeople from Douala
Reality show winners
International Boxing Organization champions
Boxers from Sydney
World Boxing Council champions
The Contender (TV series) participants
Australian male boxers
Middleweight boxers
Light-heavyweight boxers
World middleweight boxing champions
Light-middleweight boxers
Olympic boxers of Cameroon
Boxers at the 2000 Summer Olympics